Réalville is a commune in the Tarn-et-Garonne department in the Occitanie region in southern France.

History 

The town was founded by King Philip the Fair and built instead of Gardemont; it replaced what existed in Almont, which was then demolished and whose materials were used in part for the construction of the new town. Philip the Fair gave Réalville a Charter of Customs by a decree dated at Poissy in January 1310, the date considered to be that of the founding of the city.

From 1939 to 1940, an Internment camp of France was established on the municipal territory, hosting the 533rd and 534th Foreign workers group, until June 1940.

See also
Communes of the Tarn-et-Garonne department

References

Communes of Tarn-et-Garonne